Jon Sobrino  (born 1938) is a Jesuit Catholic priest and theologian, known mostly for his contributions to Latin American liberation theology. He received worldwide attention in 2007 when the Vatican's Congregation for the Doctrine of the Faith issued a notification for what they termed doctrines that are "erroneous or dangerous and may cause harm to the faithful."

Life
Born 27 December 1938 into a Basque family in Barcelona, Sobrino entered the Society of Jesus when he was 18. The following year, in 1958, he was sent to El Salvador. He later studied engineering at Saint Louis University, an American Jesuit university, and then theology at Sankt Georgen Graduate School of Philosophy and Theology in Frankfurt in West Germany for his Doctor of Theology (Dr.theol.) degree. Returning to El Salvador, he taught at the Jesuit-run University of Central America (UCA) in San Salvador, which he helped to found.

On 16 November 1989 he narrowly escaped the murder of the UCA scholars by the Atlacatl Battalion, an elite unit of the Salvadoran Army. By a coincidence, he was away from El Salvador when members of the military broke into the rectory at the UCA and brutally murdered his six fellow Jesuits, Ignacio Ellacuría, Segundo Montes, Juan Ramón Moreno, Ignacio Martín-Baró, Amando López, and Joaquín López y López, as well as their housekeeper Elba Ramos and her 16-year-old daughter Celina Ramos. The Jesuits were targeted for their outspoken work to bring a resolution to the brutal El Salvador Civil War that left about 75,000 men, women, and children dead, mostly civilians.

Investigated by the Vatican throughout his career as a professor of theology, he has remained an outspoken proponent of peace, joining protests in 2008 of the continued training of Latin American military officers in torture techniques at the School of the Americas at Fort Benning.

Works
Sobrino's main works are Jesus the Liberator (1991) and its sequel Christ the Liberator (1999), along with Christology at the Crossroads (1978), The True Church and the Poor (1984), Spirituality of Liberation (1990), The Principle of Mercy: Taking the Crucified People from the Cross (Orbis, 1994), No Salvation Outside the Poor, and Prophetic-Utopian Essays (Orbis, 2008).

Vatican notification
Because of the theological positions he took in his works, Sobrino was the subject of a theological notification; a critique statement and an admonishment by the Vatican and the Congregation for the Doctrine of the Faith in March 2007.

The congregation declared that Sobrino placed too great an emphasis on the human nature of Jesus Christ, downplaying Jesus' divine nature, and that his "works contain propositions which are either erroneous or dangerous and may cause harm to the faithful."

While certain of his teachings were declared false, the congregation did not condemn or censure him, or prohibit him from teaching or lecturing. However, Federico Lombardi at the Vatican Press Office hinted at the possibility that his bishop or superior in the Jesuit order might choose to take action.

The congregation emphasized in the notification that it was issued as part of its service "to the people of God, and particularly to the simple and poorest members of the Church." They emphasized the people's "right to know the truth ... about Christ" and therefore their corresponding duty to intervene. The notification was premised on Benedict XVI's teaching that "the first poverty among people is not to know Christ."

According to the Notification, Sobrino's erroneous propositions concerned: "1) the methodological presuppositions on which the Author bases his theological reflection, 2) the Divinity of Jesus Christ, 3) the Incarnation of the Son of God, 4) the relationship between Jesus Christ and the Kingdom of God, 5) the Self-consciousness of Jesus, and 6) the salvific value of his Death."

At the root of what the Vatican saw as Sobrino's error is his affirmation that "the 'Church of the poor' is the ecclesial 'setting' of Christology and offers it its fundamental orientation." However, the Vatican believes that it is "only the apostolic faith which the Church has transmitted through all generations that constitutes the ecclesial setting of Christology and of theology in general."

Contrary to criticisms that the Vatican acted without due consultation and unfairly, the Vatican says that a Notification is made after notifying the author of the statements that are seen to be problematic and after awaiting a reply from the author who is given 3 months whereby to respond.

Retired professor of theology Peter Hünermann (then Tübingen, Germany) declared in April 2007 that the Vatican notification was a "shock" for all theologians, because along with Sobrino "the most distinguished exegetes and systematic theologians – both Catholic and Protestant – stood in the dock". Supported by more than 100 professors of Catholic theology, Hünermann also demanded an "intelligent redevelopment" of the Vatican Congregation for the Doctrine of the Faith, because, as successor organization of the Holy Office, it still had the structure of an "early modern board of censors".

These theologians found no doctrinal errors in Sobrino's works. It is not apparent that their findings have been considered by the Congregation for the Doctrine of the Faith.

References

External links

 
  An anthology written in response to the notification.
 
 
 full text of Vatican rebuke
 
 Video clip of Sobrino discussing Salvadoran war

1938 births
20th-century Spanish Jesuits
21st-century Spanish Jesuits
People of Basque descent
Christian radicals
Dissident Roman Catholic theologians
Jesuit missionaries
Jesuit theologians
Liberation theologians
Living people
Clergy from Barcelona
Roman Catholic missionaries in El Salvador
Sankt Georgen Graduate School of Philosophy and Theology alumni
Spanish Roman Catholic missionaries
20th-century Spanish Roman Catholic theologians
Academic staff of Central American University